"Side To Side" is a song by American singer Ariana Grande, featuring Nicki Minaj, from Grande's third studio album, Dangerous Woman (2016). Grande co-wrote the song with Savan Kotecha, Alexander Kronlund, and Minaj along with its producers Max Martin and Ilya. It is a reggae-pop song, featuring guest vocals from Minaj. The song was serviced to urban contemporary radio on August 30, 2016, serving as the third single from the album.

"Side to Side" peaked at number four on both the US Billboard Hot 100 and the UK Singles Chart, becoming her first top-five single from Dangerous Woman in the former and first top-ten single from the album in the latter. It also reached number four on the Canadian Hot 100, number 3 on the Australian chart and number two in the New Zealand chart. It is her second single to top the US Mainstream Top 40 airplay chart. The single has sold 1.1 million copies as of 2018 in the country, and has been certified sextuple platinum by the Recording Industry Association of America (RIAA) for additional equivalent units.

Its music video, directed by Hannah Lux Davis, made its premiere on American clothing brand Guess's website on August 28, 2016, and features Grande in a gym and frolicking with shirtless men in a sauna together with Minaj. The music video has since received a nomination at the 2017 MTV Video Music Awards for Best Choreography. Grande and Minaj performed "Side to Side" at the 2016 MTV Video Music Awards and the American Music Awards. Grande has also promoted the song with televised performances on The Tonight Show Starring Jimmy Fallon and on The Ellen DeGeneres Show.

Background and composition
On May 13, 2016, Grande announced on her Instagram account that a new song from her album Dangerous Woman would be premiered exclusively on Apple Music every day until the release of the album. The following day, Grande posted a short preview of "Side to Side" via Instagram, then premiered the song on Apple Music the same day. On August 30, 2016, the track was sent to US urban contemporary radio and became Dangerous Womans third single.

The song was written by Max Martin, Savan Kotecha, Ilya Salmanzadeh, Alexander Kronlund, Grande and Minaj. Martin was also responsible for production, along with Salmanzadeh, as well as programming, drums, percussion, guitars, bass and keyboard. The background vocal was provided by Kotecha, Chonita Gilbert, Joi Gilliam and Taura Stinson. It was recorded at MXM Studios in Los Angeles, California and Wolf Cousins Studios in Stockholm, Sweden while Minaj's verses were recorded at Glenwood Place Studios in Burbank, California and MilkBoy the Studio in Philadelphia, Pennsylvania. "Side to Side" is written in the key of F minor with a common time tempo of 159 (or 79.5) beats per minute. Grande's vocals span two octaves, from the low note of F3 to the mixed note of F5.

The song is a reggae-pop and dancehall song complemented with R&B influences with a duration of three minutes and forty-six seconds (3:46).
Lyrically, "Side to Side" describes a feeling of soreness after sex. In an interview to MTV News reporter Gaby Wilson, Grande explained "that whole song is about riding leading to soreness". Deepa Lakshmin from MTV noted that when Minaj says the words "bicycle" and "tricycle", "she's rapping about something a bit more risqué than your standard gym workout."

Critical reception

Stephen Thomas Erlewine of AllMusic noted that the song's sound is comparable to works from Barbadian singer Rihanna. Maeve McDermott from USA Today also noted the similarities and wrote, "Grande borrows the tropical flavors and ska upstrumming that Rihanna ushered into pop music’s consciousness." She went on to praise Minaj's participation, writing, "Who better to invite on an album about female fierceness than Nicki Minaj, whose understated verse steals the show and lends Grande some real danger."

Rolling Stones writer Rob Sheffield ranked "Side to Side" at number 22 on his list of "50 Best Songs of 2016", describing it as "an ode to having so much sex you can't walk straight the next day."

Commercial performance
Following the performance at the 2016 MTV Video Music Awards on August 28, 2016, "Side to Side" made its official debut in the United States at number 31 on the US Billboard Hot 100 dated September 17, 2016. The song leaped to number 18 the next week. After six weeks on the chart, the song hiked up 12–10 on the Hot 100 issue dated October 29, 2016, marking Grande's eighth top-ten entry on the chart and Minaj's thirteenth; it also doubles as the second top-ten single from Dangerous Woman. The song later reached a peak of number four for two non-consecutive weeks, becoming the highest-charting single from the album. The song stayed in the Hot 100's top ten for 14 weeks of its chart run, dropping out of the top ten on January 28, 2017. The song also spent five weeks atop the Billboard Mainstream Top 40 airplay chart, becoming Grande's second number-one on that chart, and Minaj's first. As of June 2020, the song has sold 1.17 million copies in the country.

In Australia, "Side to Side" debuted at number 36 on the ARIA Charts and has since peaked at number three, becoming her fourth top-ten single there. In New Zealand, the song debuted at number 10, becoming her fifth top-ten single there. It rose to number five the following week and peaked at two.

In the United Kingdom, "Side to Side" initially debuted on the UK Singles Chart at number 66 in the week dated June 2, 2016 due to strong digital downloads from the parent album's release, but fell off the chart the following week. The song later re-entered at number 24 on the week dated September 9, 2016 following its official release as a single, and has since peaked at number four, earning Grande her fourth top-ten single there, and Minaj's tenth. As of March 2021, "Side to Side" is Grande's fifth most-streamed song in the United Kingdom and overall 37th most-streamed song by a female artist in the country.

Music video
Directed by Hannah Lux Davis, the music video made its official premiere on American clothing brand Guess' website on the night of August 28, 2016. The music video opens with Grande leading a spin class on stationary bicycles, performing a synchronized choreography with backup dancers. The video then transitions to a gym and locker room scene, where Grande and the backup dancers are seen with boxing equipment. Grande and Minaj are then seen in a sauna, surrounded by male models. The video featured product placement from Guess.

It surpassed 100 million views on September 19, 2016, making it Grande's twelfth Vevo-certified music video (reaching 100 million views) and Minaj's eighteenth Vevo-certified music video. On June 29, 2017, the video surpassed 1 billion views on YouTube, and as of April 2022 has received over 2 billion views, making it one of the 70 most viewed YouTube videos. It later became Grande's most viewed video, surpassing "Problem".

The music video has since received a nomination at the 2017 MTV Video Music Awards for Best Choreography.

Live performances
Grande performed "Side to Side" for the first time in "Vevo Presents" show in May 2016. Later, she performed at the 2016 MTV Video Music Awards with Minaj. Stationary bicycles and a pommel horse were featured as props in the performance. Grande also performed the song on The Tonight Show Starring Jimmy Fallon on September 8, 2016. Additionally, she performed the single in an acoustic medley with "Into You" on The Ellen DeGeneres Show on September 14, 2016. On September 24, 2016, she performed the song at the 2016 iHeartRadio Music Festival on The CW. On November 20, 2016, Grande and Minaj performed "Side to Side" at the 2016 American Music Awards. It was named the best performance of the night by editor Andrew Unterberger from Billboard. On June 4, 2017, the song was part of Grande's set list for One Love Manchester, a benefit concert for the victims of the Manchester Arena bombing. Minaj has performed the song on the setlist of her 2019 Europe tour, The Nicki Wrld Tour. Similarly, Grande has performed the song on the Dangerous Woman Tour, the Sweetener World Tour and at Coachella Valley Music and Arts Festival, along with Minaj at the latter.

 Usage in media 
The song is featured in a T-Mobile commercial which also features Grande.

It was also played in the television show Crashing. The song is featured in the 2017 dance rhythm game, Just Dance 2018.

Credits and personnel
Credits adapted from Dangerous Womans liner notes.Recording Recorded at MXM Studios and Wolf Cousins Studios (Stockholm, Sweden)
 Minaj's verses recorded at Glenwood Place Studios (Burbank, California) and MilkBoy the Studio (Philadelphia, Pennsylvania)
 Mixed at MixStar Studios (Virginia Beach, Virginia)
 Mastered at Sterling Sound (New York City, New York)
 Management Published by MXM (ASCAP) — administered by Kobalt (ASCAP), Wolf Cousins (STIM), Warner/Chappell Music (STIM), Harajuku Barbie Music/Money Mack Music/Songs of Universal, Inc. (BMI) and Grandefinale LLC
 Nicki Minaj appears courtesy of Cash Money Records
 Personnel'

Ariana Grande – lead vocals, songwriting
Nicki Minaj – featured vocals, songwriting
Max Martin – songwriting, production, programming, keyboard, guitar, bass, percussion
Savan Kotecha – songwriting, backing vocals
Ilya Salmanzadeh – songwriting, production, programming, keyboard, guitar, bass, percussion
Alexander Kronlund – songwriting
Chonita Gilbert – backing vocals
Joi Gilliam – backing vocals
Taura Stinson – backing vocals

Serban Ghenea – mixing
Sam Holland – engineering
John Hanes – mixing engineering
Joel Metzler – assistant engineering
Jordan Silva – assistant engineering
Tom Coyne – mastering
Aya Merrill – mastering
Wendy Goldstein – A&R
Scooter Braun – A&R

Track listing

Charts

Weekly charts

Year-end charts

Certifications

Release history

See also
Billboard Year-End Hot 100 singles of 2016
Billboard Year-End Hot 100 singles of 2017
List of Billboard Hot 100 top-ten singles in 2016
List of Billboard Hot 100 top-ten singles in 2017
List of Billboard Mainstream Top 40 number-one songs of 2016
List of Billboard Mainstream Top 40 number-one songs of 2017
List of best-selling singles in the United States

References

2016 singles
2016 songs
Ariana Grande songs
Nicki Minaj songs
Republic Records singles
Reggae fusion songs
Song recordings produced by Ilya Salmanzadeh
Song recordings produced by Max Martin
Songs written by Alexander Kronlund
Songs written by Ariana Grande
Songs written by Nicki Minaj
Songs written by Ilya Salmanzadeh
Songs written by Max Martin
Songs written by Savan Kotecha
Music videos directed by Hannah Lux Davis
Number-one singles in Greece
Female vocal duets